Veresdale Scrub is a locality split between the Scenic Rim Region and the City of Logan, both in Queensland, Australia.

History
Veresdale Scrub Provisional School opened on 25 April 1899. On 1 January 1909 it became Veresdale Scrub State School.

The Veresdale Scrub Hall was officially opened on Wednesday 27 November 1929 by Joseph Hopkins, the chairman of the Beaudesert Shire Council.

Formerly in the Shire of Beaudesert, Veresdale Scrub was split between Logan City and Scenic Rim Region following the local government amalgamations in March 2008.

Education 
Veresdale Scrub State School is a government primary (Prep-6) school for boys and girls at 354 Veresdale Scrub School Road. In 2018, the school had an enrolment of 124 students with 11 teachers (8 full-time equivalent) and 11 non-teaching staff (5 full-time equivalent).

There is no secondary school in Veresdale Scrub. The nearest government secondary school is Beaudesert State High School in Beaudesert to the south.

Amenities
Veresdale Scrub Dance Hall is at 454 Veresdale Scrub Road. Dances are held on Saturday nights, but since May 2020 have been suspended due to the COVID-19 pandemic.

References

External links

 

Scenic Rim Region
Suburbs of Logan City
Localities in Queensland